The percussion section is one of the main divisions of the orchestra and the concert band. It includes most percussion instruments and all unpitched instruments.

The percussion section is itself divided into three subsections:
 Pitched percussion, consisting of pitched instruments such as glockenspiel and tubular bells.
 Auxiliary percussion, consisting of all unpitched instruments such as snare drum and cymbals.
 Timpani.

These three subsections reflect the three main skill areas that a percussionist studies.

Percussion sections, consisting of similar instruments, may also be found in stage bands and other musical ensembles.

Tuned percussion

See also untuned percussion

This subsection is traditionally called tuned percussion, however the corresponding term untuned percussion is avoided in modern organology in favour of the term unpitched percussion, so the instruments of this subsection are similarly termed pitched percussion. All instruments of this subsection are pitched, and with the exception of the timpani, all pitched instruments of the percussion section are in this subsection.

They include:
 All mallet percussion instruments, and keyboard percussion instruments such as the xylophone and tubular bells.
 Collections of pitched instruments such as hand bells, tuned cowbells and crotales.
 Most other melodic percussion instruments.

Despite the name, keyboard percussion instruments do not have keyboards as such. Keyboard instruments such as the celesta and keyboard glockenspiel are not included in the percussion section owing to the very different skills required to play them, but instead are grouped in the keyboard section with instruments that require similar skills.

Auxiliary percussion

All unpitched percussion instruments are grouped into the auxiliary percussion subsection, which includes an enormous variety of instruments, including drums, cymbals, bells, shakers, whistles and even found objects.

Players are expected to be accomplished on the snare drum, bass drum, clash cymbals and other hand percussion, and to be able to adapt these skills to playing other instruments and even objects, for example the typewriter.

Timpani

The timpanist is a specialist who does not usually perform on the other percussion instruments during a concert. A high level of skill unique to this instrument is expected. While players of the keyboard and auxiliary percussion subsections often play many instruments from both subsections during a performance or piece, the timpanist is normally dedicated to that instrument.

See also
 Classification of percussion instruments
 String section
 Woodwind section
 Brass section
 Keyboard section

References

Percussion
Sections of the orchestra
Sections of the concert band